"Bust Your Windows" is a song recorded by American singer-songwriter Jazmine Sullivan from her debut album Fearless. The song was available as a digital download on Amazon in the U.S. on September 16, 2008. The song was then later released as a promo CD on November 15, 2008, after it was sent to radio stations for airplay around the U.S..

"Bust Your Windows" was nominated in the Best R&B Song category for 2009's Grammy Awards.

"Bust Your Windows" was number 58 on Rolling Stones list of the 100 Best Songs of 2008.

Composition
"Bust Your Windows" is a midtempo R&B ballad with a moderate Latin beat and a tango rhythm. It is set in common time with a moderate tempo of 107 beats per minute and is written in the key of F harmonic minor. It follows the chord progression Fm–D♭–B♭m–C. Sullivan's vocal range spans from F3 to E♭5. 

Salaam Remi contributes to the song's emotional weight with his maudlin, noir-style string samples taken from Bad Man Waltz. Epinions described the song's composition: "The musical layers are deceptively intricate, with a unison string/woodwind line that continually evolves throughout the song and a very simple vocal harmony mix that moves into a call and response against Jazmine's pleas. Neither of the facets scream for attention but repeated listens bear out just how well they framed this song."

The song interpolates the lyric "Now watch me you" from Soulja Boy Tell 'Em's signature song "Crank That (Soulja Boy)". The song features Jazmine on both lead and backing vocals.

Critical reception

Billboard gave it a positive review, describing Sullivan's performance as "one of the most challenging vocals from a female R&B artist this year. Sullivan's husky voice floats effortlessly over an eerie underlining violin score, originating from a sample of producer Salaam Remi's composition "Bad Man Waltz." Slant Magazine also reviewed the song favorably: "Sullivan exposes the reality beneath the revenge fantasy: "Oh, but why am I the one who's still crying?"

Commercial reception
The single, fueled by strong radio airplay, managed to peak at number 4 on Billboard's Hot R&B/Hip-Hop Singles Chart, becoming her second consecutive Top 5 single on that chart. "Bust Your Windows" debuted at number 81 on the Billboard Hot 100 issued for week 43 of 2008. The single also became her second consecutive Top 40 hit on the Billboard Hot 100 when it spent a total of 5 weeks within the top 40. It peaked at #31 and holds the record for Jazmine's highest-peaking single on the chart, so far. The success of the song on this chart continued for weeks on end and it eventually dropped out in early 2009, spending a total of 15 weeks charting.

Elsewhere, "Bust Your Windows" gave Jazmine her second consecutive top 20 hit on the Billboard Hot 100 Airplay Chart, where it peaked at number 18. As well as her second consecutive top 30 hit on the Billboard Hot Adult R&B Songs Chart, where it peaked at number 22. Towards the end of the single's promotion, Jazmine performed "Bust Your Windows" on CBS's The Late Late Show with Craig Ferguson in early January 2009.

Music video
On October 10, 2008, the music video for "Bust Your Windows" premiered on BET's 106 & Park. The video was also placed at #46 on BET's "Notarized: Top 100 Videos of 2008" countdown.

The music video features scenes of adultery involving Jazmine's boyfriend in the video mimicking the song and song lyrics. The video, however, does not feature Jazmine physically busting out car windows, as fans expected but instead the intense emotion of the song is displayed through Jazmine breaking wine glasses on a table; there is also a trail of glass leading up to the bedroom where she discovered what would bring out this feeling of rage within her.

The setting of the video is dark and features harsh coloured gases passing through the air whilst Jazmine is singing – adding the sense of anger and depression that the video is meant to bring out in the song. Other scenes feature her boyfriend's guilty conscience of what he's done – namely when he hesitantly looks himself in the mirror.

Covers and remixes
On September 16, 2009, Fox featured "Bust Your Windows" in their new early fall hit Glee.  The show's teenage love triangle leads Mercedes (Amber Riley) to break into her own dream-state music video singing Sullivan's 2008 hit. The song is also featured on the soundtrack album Glee: The Music, Volume 1. The Independent Andy Gill praised Riley's rendition of "Bust Your Windows", calling it the album's "most compelling moment".
Trey Songz has covered this song, releasing the underground track as a response from the male antagonist in the original song by Sullivan. 
The official remix features The-Dream. This remix is also featured on the 12" Vinyl release of the song in the U.S.
Skillz has made a remix, which contains additional vocals by Sullivan (though is not the official remix).  
Chamillionaire has also produced a freestyle called "Car Windows" which features Chalie Boy. 
Jim Jones, Busta Rhymes and Gorilla Zoe have made remixes to the song. 
Ace Hood has also recorded a freestyle over this song. 
On May 4, 2010, Jed305 posted a remake of this song, "Bust the windows out your car for some chicken". Although it's now removed, it became a YouTube sensation and had over 4.6 million views by September, 2011.
In 2011, Jesy Nelson of Little Mix sang the song for her audition for The X Factor (UK).
The song was also featured in the movie Step Up 3D. The song was covered by a contestant on The Voice UK in May 2013 and caused the song to enter the charts for the first time.
Chris Hollins and Ola Jordan performed an Argentine tango to the song in the semi-final of the seventh series of Strictly Come Dancing. They went on to win the competition.

Track listings

US 12" vinyl
(88697-42906-1; Released: 2008)
 "Bust Your Windows" (Main Mix) - 3:43
 "Bust Your Windows" (Instrumental Version) - 3:43
 "Bust Your Windows" (Remix Ft. The-Dream) - 3:49

Australia CD single
 "Bust Your Windows" (Main Mix) - 3:43
 "Need U Bad" (Remix Ft. The-Dream) - 3:49

Credits
Written by: Jazmine Sullivan, Salaam Remi, DeAndre Way
Produced by: Salaam Remi
Recorded at: Phantom Bot Studios, Los Angeles, Instrumental Zoo, Miami
Orchestral arrangement by: Stephen Coleman
Instruments: Vincent Henry, Salaam Remi, Ron Feuer
Backing vocals by: Jazmine Sullivan

Charts

Weekly charts

Year-end charts

Certifications

Release history

References

2008 singles
2000s ballads
Jazmine Sullivan songs
Songs written by Jazmine Sullivan
Pop ballads
Soul ballads
Contemporary R&B ballads
Songs about infidelity
2008 songs
Songs written by Salaam Remi
Songs about revenge
J Records singles
Arista Records singles